Hippolyte Omer Ballue (1820–1867) was a 19th-century French landscape painter.

Born in Paris, he was a follower of Narcisse Virgilio Díaz. He exhibited at the Salon from 1842 to 1851. He painted in vibrant hues landscape from Paris, Algeria and Sicily. He also designed costumes for theater (especially Paul Legrand).

He worked with oil painting but also pastels and watercolour.

External links 
 25 costumes of the Théâtre de la Porte-Saint-Martin drawn by Ballue (on Gallica).

French landscape painters
19th-century French painters
French male painters
French costume designers
1820 births
Painters from Paris
1867 deaths
19th-century French male artists